The Morelia grenade attacks took place on 15 September 2008 on the occasion of the Mexican Independence Day anniversary when thousands of people were gathered in the Plaza Melchor Ocampo, the main square of the Mexican city of Morelia, Michoacán. Shortly after the Grito in that city, led by Governor Leonel Godoy, two grenades were thrown into the crowds, killing at least eight people and injuring more than 100.

The attacks
The first blast was reported shortly after 23:00, on the Plaza itself, as the governor was intoning the traditional vivas to the heroes of the nation; the second took place some minutes later, in a sidestreet located four blocks away.

Two further explosions were reported in the immediate aftermath: one at 01:00, leaving the city along the highway to Salamanca, Guanajuato; and a fourth at 01:15, in the Santa María district in the vicinity of Morelia's bandera monumental.

Suspects
The police have blamed drug cartels for the grenade attacks, specifically the La Familia Michoacana gang. La Familia denied it and instead blamed Los Zetas. A week after the attacks, police from SIEDO and the Federal Investigations Agency arrested three men of the Los Zetas gang accused of throwing the grenades. However, the suspects were proven guilty for eleven years until 2019, when a federal corrections judge proved them innocent. They were proven innocent because they had not been present in Morelia the night of September 15,2008 and had been subject to kidnapping and false imprisonment by orders of Servando Gomez Martinez, José de Jesús Méndez Vargas,and Nazario Moreno. They had been present in the city of Lázaro Cárdenas, Michoacán and had been taken to an unincorporated town in the Apatzingan municipality. They were tortured and tied up to a tree until agents from the Procuraduría General de la República came, who were paid 10,000,000 pesos to arrest them.

Context
Morelia is the home town of President Felipe Calderón of the PAN, although the state of Michocán has traditionally been controlled by the opposition PRI and PRD. Michoacán has, since Calderón took office, been one of the federal government's focal points in its anti-drug efforts and initial suspicions indicated that  the atrocity was probably the work of the drugs cartels, either part of a battle for territory or as a warning to the government. Condemnation of the incident across the country was unanimous, as such tactics of the drug lords in attacking random citizen congregations was unprecedented in Mexican history.

References

External links 
 Time Magazine: Terror Bloodies Mexico Celebrations

2008 murders in Mexico
21st century in Michoacán
21st-century mass murder in Mexico
Crime in Michoacán
Explosions in 2008
Explosions in Mexico
Grenade attacks
Los Zetas
Mass murder in 2008
Battles of the Mexican drug war
Grenade attacks
Organized crime events in Mexico
September 2008 crimes
September 2008 events in Mexico
Terrorist incidents in Mexico in the 2000s
Terrorist incidents in North America in 2008